A National Assembly is either a unicameral legislature, the lower house of a bicameral legislature, or both houses of a bicameral legislature together.

National Assembly may also refer to:

Currently in use
 National Assembly (Afghanistan), the legislature of Afghanistan
 National Assembly (Cambodia), the lower house of the Cambodian parliament
 National Assembly (France), the lower house of the French parliament
 National Assembly of the Gambia, the unicameral legislative body of The Gambia
 National Assembly (Kenya)
 National Assembly (Madagascar), the lower legislative body of Madagascar
 National Assembly (Nigeria)
 National Assembly (Quebec), the unicameral legislative body of Quebec
 National Assembly (Senegal), the unicameral legislative body of Senegal
 National Assembly of South Africa, the lower house of the Parliament of South Africa, located in Cape Town.
 National Assembly (South Korea), the unicameral legislative body of South Korea
 National Assembly (Venezuela), de jure legislature for Venezuela
 National Assembly of Pakistan

Historically
 National Assembly (French Revolution), the Assemblée Nationale existing from June 13 to July 9, 1789, formed from the Estates General
 National Constituent Assembly (France), the Assemblée Nationale constituante existing from July 9, 1789, to September 30, 1791, formed from the National Assembly
 (National) Legislative Assembly (France), the legislative body of the limited monarchy created by the Constitution of 1791
 National Assembly (1871), a temporary French body elected on February 4, 1871, at the end of the Franco-Prussian War
 National Assembly (Republic of China), a legislature that existed in various forms from 1913 to 2006, first in China and subsequently in Taiwan after the Chinese Civil War
 National Assembly (Spain), a corporative chamber in Spain active from 1927 to 1929
 Prussian National Assembly, a constitutional assembly of Prussia existing from November 5 to December 5, 1848
 Greek National Assemblies, a series of constitutional assemblies held sporadically since 1821
 Roman assemblies, various legislative bodies on ancient Rome
 National Assembly of Soviets, a legislature of the brief Hungarian Soviet Republic, existing only in June, 1919
 National State Assembly, the legislative body of Sri Lanka from May 22, 1972 to September 7, 1978
 National Assembly for Wales, existing from July 1, 1999 to May 6, 2020; renamed as the Welsh Parliament or Senedd Cymru in Welsh